A statue of Christopher Columbus stood in Camden, New Jersey, United States. The memorial was removed in June 2020. Levi Coombs III, pastor of the nearby First Refuge Progressive Baptist Church, stated that residents had called for the removal of the statue for 40 years but been ignored until the aftermath of the George Floyd protests. Camden Mayor Frank Moran stated, "There were a lot of atrocities toward the human beings that were on the island of Puerto Rico and other Caribbean islands by this individual, and I believe [the statue] is and was offensive to all people of color, whether black or brown."

See also
 List of monuments and memorials removed during the George Floyd protests
 List of monuments and memorials to Christopher Columbus

References

Buildings and structures in Camden, New Jersey
Monuments and memorials in New Jersey
Monuments and memorials removed during the George Floyd protests
Monuments and memorials to Christopher Columbus
Sculptures of men in New Jersey
Statues in New Jersey
Camden, New Jersey
Statues removed in 2020